A rotary phase converter, abbreviated RPC, is an electrical machine that converts power from one polyphase system to another, converting through rotary motion. Typically, single-phase electric power is used to produce three-phase electric power locally to run three-phase loads in premises where only single-phase is available.

Operation
A basic three-phase induction motor will have three windings, each end connected to terminals typically numbered (arbitrarily) as L1, L2, and L3 and sometimes T1, T2, T3. 

A three-phase induction motor can be run at two-thirds of its rated horsepower on single-phase power applied to a single winding, once spun up by some means.  A three-phase motor running on a single phase cannot start itself because it lacks the other phases to create a rotation on its own, much like a crank that is at dead center.

A three-phase induction motor that is spinning under single-phase power applied to terminals L1 and L2 will generate an electric potential (voltage) across terminal L3 in respect with L1 and L2.  However, L1 to L3 and L2 to L3 will be 120 degrees out of phase with the input voltage, thus creating three-phase power. However, without current injection, special idler windings, or other means of regulation, the voltage will sag when a load is applied.

Power-factor correction is a very important consideration when building or choosing an RPC. This is desirable because an RPC that has power-factor correction will consume less current from the single-phase service supplying power to the phase converter and its loads.  

A major concern with three phase power is that each phase be at similar voltages.  A discrepancy between phases is known as phase imbalance. As a general guideline, unbalanced three-phase power that exceeds 4% in voltage variation can damage the equipment that it is meant to operate.

History

At the beginning of the 20th century, there were two main principles of electric railway traction current systems:
 DC system
 16⅔ Hz single phase system
These systems used series-wound traction motors. All of them needed a separated supply system or converters to take power from the standard 50 Hz electric network.

Kandó synchronous phase converter 
Kálmán Kandó recognized that the electric traction system must be supplied by single-phase 50 Hz power from the standard electric network, and it must be converted in the locomotive to three-phase power for traction motors.

He created an electric machine called a synchronous phase converter, which was a single-phase synchronous motor and a three-phase synchronous generator with common stator and rotor.

It had two independent windings:
 The outer winding is a single-phase synchronous motor. The motor takes the power from the overhead line.
 The inner winding is a three-phase (or variable-phase) synchronous generator, which provides the power for the three- (or more) phase traction motors.

Single-phase supply 
The direct feed from a standard electric network makes the system less complicated than the earlier systems and makes possible simple recuperation.

The single-phase feed makes it possible to use a single overhead line. More overhead lines increase the costs, and restrict the maximum speed of the trains.

Speed control 
The asynchronous traction motor can run on a single RPM determined by the frequency of the feeding current and the loading torque.

The solution was to use more secondary windings on phase converter, and more windings on motor different number of magnetic poles.

Types 
A rotary phase converter (RPC) may be built as a motor-generator set. These completely isolate the load from the single-phase supply and produce balanced three-phase output. However, due to weight, cost, and efficiency concerns, most RPCs are not built this way.

Instead, they are built out of a three-phase induction motor or generator, called an idler, on which two of the terminals (the idler inputs) are powered from the single-phase line.  The rotating flux in the motor produces a voltage on the third terminal. A voltage is induced in the third terminal that is phase shifted from the voltage between the first two terminals. In a three-winding motor, two of the windings are acting as a motor, and the third winding is acting as a generator.  Because two of the outputs are the same as the single phase input, their phase relationship is 180°. This leaves the synthesized phase to be +/-90° from the input terminals.  This non-ideal phase relationship requires a slight power de-rating of motors driven by this type of phase converter. Also, since the third, synthesized phase is driven differently from the other two, its response to load changes may be different causing this phase to sag more under load.  Since induction motors are sensitive to voltage imbalance, this is another factor in de-rating of motors driven by this type of phase converter.  For example, a small 5% imbalance in phase voltage requires a much larger 24% reduction of motor rated power. Thus tuning a rotary phase converter circuit for equal phase voltages under maximum load may be quite important.

Power quality
A common measure of the quality of the power produced by an RPC or any phase converter is the voltage balance, which may be measured while the RPC is driving a balanced load such as a three-phase motor. Other quality measures include the harmonic content of the power produced and the power factor of the RPC motor combination as seen by the utility. Selection of the best phase converter for any application depends on the sensitivity of the load to these factors.   Three-phase induction motors are very sensitive to voltage imbalances.

The quality of three-phase power generated by such a phase converter depends upon a number of factors including:
 Power capacity of the phase converter (idler horsepower rating).
 Power level demands of the equipment being supplied. For instance, "hard starting" loads such as heavily loaded machinery or well pumps may have higher requirements than other loads rated at the same horsepower.
 Power quality demands of the equipment being supplied (CNC equipment may have more stringent power quality requirements than a welding machine)
 Use of techniques to balance the voltage between the three legs.

Quality improvement
RPC manufacturers use a variety of techniques to deal with these problems. Some of the techniques include,

  The insertion of capacitors between the terminals to balance the power at a particular load.
  The use of idlers with higher power ratings than the loads.
  The construction of special idler motors with more windings on the third terminal to boost the voltage and compensate for the sag caused by the load.
  The use of electronics to switch in capacitors, during start up or otherwise, based on the load.
  The use of filters.

Uses

General
Demand exists for phase converters due to the use of three-phase motors. (Three-phase motors have higher efficiency, reduced complexity, with regards to starting, and three-phase power is significantly available where they are used.)

Electric railways
Rotary phase converters are used to produce a single-phase for the single overhead conductor in electric railways.  Five European countries (Germany, Austria, Switzerland, Norway, and Sweden), where electricity is three-phase AC at 50 Hz, have standardised on single-phase AC at 15 kV  Hz for railway electrification; phase converters are, therefore, used to change both phases and frequency.  In the Soviet Union, they were used on AC locomotives to convert single phase, 50 Hz to 3-phase for driving induction motors for traction motor cooling blowers, etc.

Alternatives to rotary converters 
Alternatives exist to rotary phase converters for operation of three-phase equipment on a single-phase power supply.

Static phase converters 
These may be an alternative where the issue at hand is starting a motor, rather than polyphase power itself. The static phase converter is used to start a three-phase motor. The motor then runs on a single phase with a synthesised third pole. However, this makes the power balance, and thus motor efficiency, extremely poor, requiring de-rating the motor (typically to 60% or less).  Overheating, and quite often destruction of the motor, will result from failing to do so.  (Many manufacturers and dealers specifically state that using a static converter will void any warranty.)  An oversized static converter can remove the need to de-rate the motor, but at an increased cost.

Inverter drives (VFDs) 
The popularity of the Variable-frequency drive (VFD) has increased in the last decade, especially in the home-shop market. This is because of their relative low cost and ability to generate three-phase output from single phase input.  A VFD converts AC power to DC and then converts it back to AC through a transistor bridge, a technology that is somewhat analogous to that of a switch-mode power supply.  As the VFD generates its AC output from the DC bus, it is possible to power a three-phase motor from a single-phase source.  Nevertheless, commercial-grade VFDs are produced that require three-phase input, as there are some efficiency gains to be had with such an arrangement.

A typical VFD functions by rapidly switching transistors on and off to "chop" the voltage on the DC bus through what is known as pulse-width modulation (PWM).  Proper use of PWM will result in an AC output whose voltage and frequency can be varied over a fairly wide range.  As an induction motor's rotational speed is proportional to input frequency, a change in the VFD's output frequency will cause the motor to change speed.  Voltage is also changed in a way that results in the motor producing a relatively constant torque over the useful speed range.

The output of a quality VFD is an approximation of a sine wave, with some high frequency harmonic content.  Harmonic content will elevate motor temperature and may produce some whistling or whining noise that could be objectionable.  The effects of unwanted harmonics can be mitigated by the use of reactive output filtering, which is incorporated into better quality VFDs. Reactive filtration impedes the high frequency harmonic content but has little effect on the fundamental frequency that determines motor speed.  The result is an output to the motor that is closer to an ideal sine wave.

However, modern VFDs have dropped considerably in cost, making them more affordable than comparable RPCs. Also working in the VFD's favor is its more compact size relative to its electrical capacity. A plus is many VFDs can produce a "soft start" effect (in which power is gradually applied to the motor), which reduces the amount of current that must be delivered at machine start-up.

Use of a VFD may result in motor damage if the motor is not rated for such an application.  This is primarily because most induction motors are forced-air cooled by a fan or blower driven by the motor itself.  Operating such a motor at a lower-than-normal speed will substantially reduce the cooling airflow, increasing the likelihood of overheating and winding damage or failure, especially while operating at full load.  A manufacturer may void the warranty on a motor powered by a VFD unless the motor is "inverter-rated."  As VFDs are the most popular method of powering motors in new commercial installations, most three-phase motors sold today are, in fact, inverter-rated.

See also 
 Frequency converter
 Kálmán Kandó
 Rotary converter
 Three-phase electric power

References 

 Sitkei Gyula: A magyar elektrotechnika nagy alakjai. (Energetikai Kiadó Kht. 2005)
 

Electrical engineering
Hungarian inventions
AC power